Moskva is a village in Penovsky District of Tver Oblast, Russia, located on the shore of Ordonikolskoye Lake.

In 1859, the village was a part of Ostashkovsky Uyezd of Tver Governorate and had a population of 48 (23 males and 25 females) comprising five households.

References

Rural localities in Penovsky District
Ostashkovsky Uyezd